A constitutional referendum was held in Algeria on 19 November 1976. The amendments restored the People's National Assembly (which had been suspended since the 1965 coup) and allowed for the direct election of the President, as well as creating a socialist state and confirming the National Liberation Front as the sole legal party., Approved by 99% of voters with a 92.9% turnout, the revised constitution was promulgated on 22 November.

Results

References

1976 in Algeria
1976 referendums
Constitutional referendums in Algeria